Maharajadhiraj Sir Raj Rajeshwar Sawai Shri Tukojirao III Holkar XIII Bahadur  (26 November 1890 – 21 May 1978) was the Maharaja of Indore State in central India between 1903 and 1926.

Early years
Tukoji was born in 1890, the son of Shivajirao Holkar, Maharaja of Indore. His mother was Maharani Sita Bai Sahib Holkar. His father abdicated in on 31 January 1903, whereupon Tukoji became Maharaja. As he was only 13 years old, a council of regency was appointed, which lasted until he came of age. On 6 November 1911, at the age of 21, Tukoji was invested with ruling powers and the regency was ended. Tukoji completed his education from the Daly College, Indore and ICC, Dehradun. 

In 1911, Tukoji attended the coronation of George V of the United Kingdom in London. He founded the Order of Merit of Holkar (February 1914) and the Order of Ahilyabai Holkar (22 November 1920). He was invested as a Knight Grand Commander of the Order of the Star of India in the 1918 New Year Honours.

Abdication
Tukoji abdicated in favour of his only son Yashwantrao Holkar II on 26 February 1926. This happened because of a scandalous murder which happened in Bombay, in which Tukoji was involved. The British government compelled him to abdicate and leave Indore permanently. After his abdication, Tukoji resided mainly in France. The incident inspired a film, Kulin Kanta.

Marriages and issue
Tukoji married three times. His senior wife was HH Maharani Chandravati Bai Holkar, daughter of Raoji Gawade, a nobleman of Indore state. The wedding was held on 16 March 1895, when Tukoji was hardly four years old; his bride was only seven years old. The marriage, which lasted all their lives, was blessed with two children, including his only son and successor. Maharani Chandravati Bai remained in Indore after Tukoji's abdication, and raised her minor son, the next Maharaja of Indore. An embodiment of traditional values and culture, Maharani Chandravati Bai was always sympathetic and supportive to her husband, and maintained a cordial relationship with him all her life. In later years, she occasionally traveled outside Indore state to meet Tukoji whenever he visited India. 

In 1913, Tukoji married Maharani Indira Bai Holkar (b. 1896), daughter of Mukundrao Talcherkar, an important government officer based in Bombay. She bore him a single daughter, who died in 1925 aged ten years from sepsis. Maharani Indira Bai also remained in Indore after the abdication and exile of her husband. She had a strong interest in history and in religion. After Tukoji's exile, which happened an year after the death of their daughter, Maharani Indira Bai occupied herself with pursuing these interests in earnest. She served as patron of several historical research bodies, including the Rajwade Historical Research Institute, the Ramdas Research Institute, Dhule; the Vedic Research Society, Pune; the Dharmakosha Karyalaya, Wai, Maharashtra; and, after independence, the Maharashtra Sahitya Parishad. The two Maharanis resided in the same palace in Indore and enjoyed a genuinely cordial, even affectionate relationship, after Tukoji left for exile. 

In 1928, two years after his abdication and exile, Tukoji married for the third and last time. His bride was Sharmista Devi Holkar, born Nancy Anne Miller, an American woman. Before the wedding, Nancy Anne Miller embraced Hinduism and was received into the Dhangar community. She was sponsored and adopted by Princess Tarabai and her husband, Colonel Lambhate, who also gave her away in marriage to Tukoji. Sharmishta Holkar bore four daughters

HH Tukojirao died in Paris on 21 May 1978. He had one son and six daughters.

See also
Kulin Kanta
Yeshwant Club
Daly College
Indore State 
Maratha Empire
List of Maratha dynasties and states

References

1890 births
1978 deaths
Indian knights
Maharajas of Indore
Knights Grand Commander of the Order of the Indian Empire
Monarchs who abdicated